"He'll Have to Stay" is a song written by Audrey Allison, Charles Grean, and Joe Allison and performed by Jeanne Black. The song is an answer song to Jim Reeves' 1959 hit "He'll Have to Go".  It was produced by Ken Nelson.

It reached #4 on the US pop chart, #6 on the US country chart, #11 on the US R&B chart, and #41 on the UK Singles Chart in 1960. The song was featured on her 1960 album, A Little Bit Lonely.

The single ranked #52 on the Billboard Year-End Hot 100 singles of 1960.

Chart performance

Cover versions and later versions
Caterina Valente released a version of the song in the Netherlands entitled "Caro Mio" as the B-side to her 1960 single "Zeeman (Je Verlangen Is De Zee)".
Ann-Louise Hanson released a version of the song in the Sweden entitled "Han Stannar Här" as part of an EP in 1960.
Skeeter Davis released a version of the song on her 1961 album, Here's the Answer.

References

1960 songs
1960 singles
Songs written by Charles Randolph Grean
Songs written by Joe Allison
Jeanne Black songs
Song recordings produced by Ken Nelson (American record producer)
Capitol Records singles
Answer songs
Songs about telephone calls